Frans or Franciscus Titelmans ( or Hasseltensis) (1502–1537) was a Franciscan scholar from the Habsburg Netherlands, and an intellectual opponent of Erasmus.

Life
He was born in Hasselt, and graduated M.A. at the University of Leuven in 1521. He was a dialectician influenced by Rudolph Agricola, and himself an influence on Petrus Ramus. He joined the Franciscan Order in 1523, and engaged in controversy with Erasmus over the interpretation of the Pauline Epistles in the period 1527 to 1530. He wrote a compendium on natural philosophy which was much reprinted.

He became a Capuchin in 1535 and moved to Italy, where he worked in a hospital for the incurably ill. He died at Anticoli di Campagna.

Works
Collationes quinque super Epistolam ad Romanos beati Pauli Apostoli (Antwerp, Willem Vorsterman, 1529). Available on Google Books.
Libri duodecim de consyderatione rerum naturalium (Antwerp, Simon Cock, 1530).
Tractatus de expositione mysteriorum missae (Antwerp, Willem Vorsterman, 1530). Available on Google Books.
Elucidatio in omnes psalmos iuxta veritatem vulgatae (Antwerp, Martin Lempereur, 1531). Available on Google Books.
Annotationes ex Hebræo atque Chaldæo in omnes Psalmos (Antwerp, Simon Cock, 1531).

Notes

References
Franaut page
Article in Contemporaries of Erasmus

David A. Lines, "Teaching Physics in Louvain and Bologna: Frans Titelmans and Ulisse Aldrovandi", in Scholarly Knowledge: Textbooks in Early Modern Europe, ed. by Emidio Campi, Simone De Angelis, Anja-Silvia Goeing, Anthony T. Grafton in cooperation with Rita Casale, Jürgen Oelkers and Daniel Tröhler (Geneva: Droz, 2008), pp. 183–203.

1502 births
1537 deaths
Capuchins
Flemish Friars Minor
Roman Catholic priests of the Habsburg Netherlands
People from Hasselt
Roman Catholic theologians of the Habsburg Netherlands
Natural philosophers